Butler Yeats is a surname. Notable people with the surname include:

 Jack Butler Yeats (1871–1957), Irish artist, brother of William
 John Butler Yeats (1839–1922), Irish artist, father of Jack and William
 William Butler Yeats (1865–1939), Irish poet and dramatist

See also
 Yeats (surname)